Eudoliche vittata is a moth of the subfamily Arctiinae first described by Heinrich Benno Möschler in 1878. It is found in Suriname and the Amazon region.

References

Lithosiini